Affonso Gonçalves (born 8 June 1967) is a Brazilian-American film editor. He is best known for editing many critically acclaimed films such as Winter's Bone (2010), Beasts of the Southern Wild (2012), Only Lovers Left Alive (2013), Carol (2015), Paterson (2016), and Wonderstruck (2017).

In 2014, Gonçalves was nominated for a Primetime Emmy Award for editing the episode "Who Goes There" in the first season of True Detective.

Early life
Gonçalves was born in Brazil. He studied at the London International Film School for three years before studying at the American Film Institute for two and a half years.

Career
Gonçalves first served as the assistant editor for Todd Solondz's Welcome to the Dollhouse (1995). Gonçalves is a  frequent collaborator of Todd Haynes's first beginning with Mildred Pierce. Gonçalves was nominated for an American Cinema Editors award for Best Edited Miniseries or Motion Picture for Television. He went onto edit Carol (2015), where he received a nomination for a Satellite Awards for Best Film Editing.

Gonçalves is also frequent collaborator of Jim Jarmusch, first beginning on Only Lovers Left Alive (2013). He served as the films editor and music editor. and went onto edit Paterson (2016), and Gimme Danger (2016).

Gonçalves received his first Primetime Emmy Nomination for Primetime Emmy Award for Outstanding Single-Camera Picture Editing for a Drama Series for his work on True Detective (2014). He won an American Cinema Editors award for Best Edited One-Hour Series for Non-Commercial Television.

In 2016, Gonçalves edited Little Men directed by Ira Sachs.

In December 2021, he was nominated for an Independent Spirit Award for Best Editing for his work on A Chiara.

Partial filmography

References

External links
 

Brazilian film editors
American film editors
Alumni of the London Film School
AFI Conservatory alumni
1967 births
Living people